John Dilson (February 18, 1891 – June 1, 1944) was an American film actor. He appeared in more than 250 films between 1934 and 1944.

Selected filmography

 A Man's Game (1934)
 The Westerner (1934)
 The Girl Who Came Back (1935)
 Death from a Distance (1935)
 Cheers of the Crowd (1935)
 Robinson Crusoe of Clipper Island (1936)
 The Drag-Net (1936)
 The Public Pays (1936)
 Gentle Julia (1936)
 Three of a Kind (1936)
 Dick Tracy (1937)
 Gang Bullets (1938)
 Laugh It Off (1939)
 Racketeers of the Range (1939)
 Scandal Sheet (1939)
 A Woman Is the Judge (1939)
 Phantom of Chinatown (1940)
 Beyond the Sacramento (1940)
 The Man with Nine Lives (1940)
 Marked Men (1940)
 Hold That Woman! (1940)
The Secret Seven (1940)
 Pioneers of the West (1940)
 Thundering Frontier (1940)
 Danger Ahead (1940)
 Dick Tracy vs. Crime, Inc. (1941)
 They Meet Again (1941)
 Father Steps Out (1941)
 Across the Sierras (1941)
 Madame Spy (1942)
 Tramp, Tramp, Tramp (1942)
 So's Your Uncle (1943)
 She Has What It Takes (1943)
 Buffalo Bill (1944) (uncredited)

References

External links

1891 births
1944 deaths
20th-century American male actors
American male film actors
Male actors from New York City